William V. Bell is an American politician and engineer who served as the mayor of Durham, North Carolina.

Formerly a senior engineer for IBM, Bell was first elected to the Durham County Board of  Commissioners in 1972, where he served until 1994, and again from 1996 to 2000. He was the chairman of the Durham County Commissioners from 1982 to 1994. Bell was first elected mayor of Durham in 2001 and was subsequently re-elected seven more times.

Bell is currently Executive Vice President and Chief Operating Officer of UDI Community Development Corp., a non-profit organization. He is a member of the Mayors Against Illegal Guns Coalition, a bi-partisan group with a stated goal of "making the public safer by getting illegal guns off the streets." The Coalition was co-founded by Boston Mayor Thomas Menino and New York City Mayor Michael Bloomberg.

2007 Mayor Re-election Campaign

In 2007, Bell was challenged by Republican Thomas Stith, III. Thomas Stith attacked Bell over several city issues including violence. During the weekend of October 13 and October 14, two people were murdered in Durham. On October 15, Bell tried to calm the public about the murders, claiming the city was safe and the weekend murders were not random. The next day, Stith went after Bell, pointing out that Durham's murder rate was up nearly 50 percent over the previous year. Stith and Bell continued to argue over how to deal with Durham crime. Stith consistently claimed that he would fight crime more consistently than Bell had, while Bell said that Stith had six years on the town council to do that. Stith said he wanted to see more police officers on the streets, while Bill Bell said the current police officers are well equipped.

In late October 2007, after lead was found in Durham drinking water, Stith sent out a campaign mailer that said in bold letters: "Bill Bell knew and didn't tell us our water was dangerous to drink." Bell responded to this by saying, "That mailer sent out by Thomas Stith was a complete lie." Bell also said that Stith had no leadership experience.

Bell was re-elected in the November 6, 2007 election, getting 58% of the vote as opposed to Stith's 42%.

Controversy
It was later revealed that Bell endorsed and donated money to now-disgraced, former district attorney Mike Nifong during his reelection campaign surrounding the 2006 Duke University lacrosse case.

Bell also has been accused of being anti-preservation, as his company, UDI, gets many Durham contracts to demolish historic structures.

See also
2001 Durham mayoral election
2003 Durham mayoral election
2005 Durham mayoral election
2007 Durham mayoral election
2009 Durham mayoral election
2013 Durham mayoral election
2011 Durham mayoral election
2015 Durham mayoral election

References

External links

Durham Bio: Mayor William V. Bell 

County commissioners in North Carolina
Mayors of Durham, North Carolina
Durham, North Carolina City Council members
African-American mayors in North Carolina
Howard University alumni
Polytechnic Institute of New York University alumni
Living people
1941 births
21st-century American politicians
African-American city council members in North Carolina
21st-century African-American politicians
20th-century African-American people